Abacion is a genus of crested millipedes in the family Abacionidae. There are about 10 described species in Abacion.

Species
These 10 species belong to the genus Abacion:
 Abacion creolum (Chamberlin, 1942)
 Abacion highlandense (Hoffman, 1950)
 Abacion jonesi (Chamberlin, 1942)
 Abacion lactarium (Say, 1821)
 Abacion magnum (Loomis, 1943)
 Abacion spinosa (Sager, 1856)
 Abacion tesselatum Rafinesque, 1820
 Abacion texense (Loomis, 1937)
 Abacion texensis (Loomis, 1937)
 Abacion wilhelminae Shelley, McAllister & Hollis, 2003

Identification 
Abacion are large, dark brown millipedes with six primary dorsel crests between pore crests on body ring 12.

References

Further reading

External links

 

Callipodida
Articles created by Qbugbot